The Deggendorfer SC (also known as Deggendorf Fire) is a professional ice hockey club based in Deggendorf, Bavaria, Germany. The club currently competes in Oberliga, the third level of ice hockey in Germany. The Fire was originally founded in 1973 with the current operations setup in 2002. Deggendorfer’s home arena is the Eissporthalle an der Trat, which holds 4,000 spectators. The club also operates junior ice hockey and figure skating programs.

Titles

Oberliga
Champions (1): 1976

Regionalliga
Champions (1): 1990

German Junior Championship
Champions (1): 2002

Season-by-season-record

External links

Official website
Official Facebook
Elite Prospects profile

Ice hockey teams in Germany
Ice hockey clubs established in 1973
Ice hockey teams in Bavaria
Deggendorf
1973 establishments in West Germany